Daniel "Pidgey" Morgan  (May 1853–January 30, 1910) was an American professional baseball player who played outfield for the 1875 St. Louis Red Stockings and the 1878 Milwaukee Grays.

References

External links

Baseball players from Missouri
St. Louis Red Stockings players
Milwaukee Grays players
19th-century baseball players
1853 births
1910 deaths
Major League Baseball outfielders
Minor league baseball managers
Milwaukee (minor league baseball) players